Trawsfynydd Camp railway station, sometimes referred to as Trawsfynydd Military station served the Trawsfynydd Artillery range at Bronaber, south of Trawsfynydd in Gwynedd, Wales. The station never opened for civilian traffic.

Origins
At Festiniog passengers had to transfer to narrow gauge trains if they wished to continue northwards.

The following year the narrow gauge line was converted to standard gauge, but narrow gauge trains continued to run until 5 September 1883 using a third rail. Standard gauge trains first ran through from Bala and Trawsfynydd to Blaenau Ffestiniog on 10 September 1883. The line was taken over by the Great Western Railway in 1910.

Military usage
The line through Trawsfynydd had been established for around twenty years when an artillery training camp was set up at Bryn Golau, on the southern outskirts of Trawsfynydd. It was replaced in 1906 by a larger camp further south at Rhiw Goch, which was more widely referred to as being at Bronaber, after the nearby settlement of that name.

Artillery of the period required the transportation of men, horses, field guns and ammunition, together with supplies such as fodder. As a training camp the turnover of men in particular was considerable, many attending for two week "camps". The area is remote and roads remain few, so the railway was the obvious means to move men and materials. In 1910 the railway decided to build additional, specialised platforms and ramps on the northern side of the bridge which was at the northern end of the conventional station; these were opened in Summer 1911 and became known as "Trawsfynydd Camp station", though that name does not appear on documents such as Working Timetables.

The station had no need of ticket offices or waiting rooms. All traffic was by booked special trains exclusively for military personnel, though the locomotives, rolling stock and crew were all Great Western. The only buildings were a corrugated iron warehouse, a guards' room and two lavatories. Three unusual features were provided:

 several water troughs on the wide and gently sloping approach road
 a wooden "screen" made of fencing material with all vertical timbers edge to edge. This was placed between the single track running line and the military station. Its purpose was said to be to prevent horses being frightened by the sight of passing locomotives.
 a "Gun Wharf" which consisted of a bay platform where open-ended vehicles carrying equipment such as artillery pieces could be wheeled straight off the end onto the platform

Personnel disembarked onto the "Troop Platform", which was an island with the screen to one side. Horses detrained onto the "Horse Landing" which led straight to the water troughs and the road to the camp. Guns and other large equipment was unloaded at the Gun Wharf, also known as the Gun Platform. The trains shown in published photographs often mixed carriages, horse boxes and wagons. They were routinely much the longest trains to use the line and needed double-heading or the use of more powerful locomotives normally excluded from the route.

Traffic was heavy during the World Wars and considerable between. The Harlech Military Railway article mentions connections with the Trawsfynydd camp, but it is unlikely that this involved rail traffic, because the distance by road is short, but by rail is very long.

Traffic reduced after 1945, but was considerable for some time as the camp was used to dispose of unused artillery shells by firing them on the range. Military traffic had petered out by the late 1950s and the camp was closed as a military establishment in 1957 or 1958, only to reopen "almost overnight" to house workers building Trawsfynydd nuclear power station. These people were bussed to work, bringing no custom to the railway except when coming to or leaving from their distant homes.

The line from Bala north to Trawsfynydd was designated in the restrictive "Blue" weight limit, with the section from Trawsfynydd to Blaenau limited even more tightly to "Yellow". The literature conjectures on overweight classes being used on troop trains, but no solid claim or photograph has been published. Photos of heavy troop trains show 0-6-0STs double-heading, Only four steam age photos of the line show anything other than an 0-4-2 or 0-6-0 tank engine, three being of GWR 2251 Class 0-6-0s taken in the 1940s on ordinary civilian workings. The only one of anything larger is of a "43XX" 2-6-0 on a military train at Trawsfynydd Camp station. That class were nevertheless classified as "Blue". As the 1950s passed "5700" and "7400" 0-6-0PTs stole the show, exemplified by 9610 at Festiniog in the 1950s. 0-4-2T engines "..suffer[ed] from limited tank capacity and power."

In 1907 an accident occurred involving a military train in which both drivers and two soldiers were injured.

With the camp closed the station had no residual purpose except for siding space.

Closure 
The line through the station closed to passengers in January 1960 and to freight a year later. Tracks north of that halt sprung back to life in 1964 to serve Trawsfynydd nuclear power station.

By 2017 the site had been put to agricultural use and was hardly recognisable as a former station.

References

Sources

Further material

External links
 The station site on a navigable OS Map National Library of Scotland
 The station and line Rail Map Online
 The line LJT2 with mileages Railway Codes
 Remisinscences by a local railwayman Forgotten Relics
 Driver's view along the line to Blaenau YouTube
 The line in 2009 The Railway Muddler
 Deatails and photos of 22 Jan 1961 railtour Six Bells Junction
 The 1961 last train special YouTube
 An inspection saloon ride on the line, Part 1 YouTube
 An inspection saloon ride on the line, Part 2 YouTube
 Photos of the camp in use Keith O'Brien
 Modern photos of camp relics Keith O'Brien
 Photos of the camp in use Old UK Photos
 Soldiers driving through the camp Peoples' Collection Wales
 Remains of the station Geograph
 Signal box diagram Signalling Record Society

Disused railway stations in Gwynedd
Trawsfynydd
Former Great Western Railway stations
Railway stations in Great Britain closed in 1961
Railway stations in Great Britain opened in 1911